The 1962 CONCACAF Youth Tournament was the first international association football championship tournament for youth national teams in the CONCACAF region, North and Central America and the Caribbean. This tournament is the forerunner of the current CONCACAF Under-20 Championship. The tournament took place in Panama City, Panama and was won by Mexico.

Teams
The following teams entered the tournament:

First round

Group A

Group B

Final round

Results

See also 

 CONCACAF Under-20 Championship

References

External links 
 1962 CONCACAF Youth Tournament at CONCACAF.com
 Results by RSSSF

1962 in CONCACAF football
1962
1962
1962 in youth association football
March 1962 sports events in North America